cdrdao (“CD recorder disc-at-once”) is a free utility software product for authoring and ripping of CD-ROMs. The program is released under the GPL. Cdrdao records audio or data CD-Rs in disk-at-once mode based on a textual description of the CD contents, known as a TOC file that can be created and customized inside a text editor.

cdrdao runs from command line and has no graphical user interface, except for third-party ones such as K3b (Linux), Gcdmaster (Linux) or XDuplicator (Windows).

References

External links

cdrdao man page
Gcdmaster page
XDuplicator website
K3b website

Free optical disc authoring software
Free software programmed in C++
Console CD ripping software
Linux CD ripping software